Harrie Crane "Jack" Reis (June 14, 1891 – July 20, 1939) was a pitcher in Major League Baseball. He played for the St. Louis Cardinals in 1911.

References

External links

1891 births
1939 deaths
Major League Baseball pitchers
St. Louis Cardinals players
Baseball players from Ohio
Cincinnati Bearcats baseball players
Charlotte Hornets (baseball) players
Winston-Salem Twins players
Greenville Spinners players
Erie Sailors players
Columbia Comers players
Savannah Indians players
Indianapolis Hoosiers (minor league) players
St. Louis Terriers players